Marlon Riter Ayoví Mosquera (born September 27, 1971) is a retired Ecuadorian footballer. A midfielder, he played 76 times for Ecuador between 1998 and 2007.

Career
Ayoví made his debut for the national squad on October 14, 1998 with a loss (1-5) in a friendly against Brazil.

He is currently contracted with Barcelona S.C in Ecuador. Ayoví was a member of the Ecuador squad for the 2002 and 2006 FIFA World Cups. He played as a defensive midfielder.

References

External links

1971 births
Living people
Sportspeople from Guayaquil
Ecuadorian footballers
Ecuador international footballers
S.D. Quito footballers
C.D. Universidad Católica del Ecuador footballers
Barcelona S.C. footballers
1999 Copa América players
2001 Copa América players
2002 CONCACAF Gold Cup players
2002 FIFA World Cup players
2004 Copa América players
2006 FIFA World Cup players
Association football midfielders